Warumungu Sign Language is a sign language used by the Warumungu, an Aboriginal community in the central desert region of Australia. Along with Warlpiri Sign Language, it is (or perhaps was) one of the most elaborate of all Australian Aboriginal sign languages.

References

Australian Aboriginal Sign Language family
Pama–Nyungan languages